Indicator is the third and final studio album from Onward to Olympas. Facedown Records released the album on October 9, 2012. Onward to Olympas worked with Taylor Larson, in the production of this album.

Critical reception

Awarding the album two stars from Alternative Press, Dan Slessor states, "Indicator is a record for the already converted, and there’s nothing wrong with that, per se." Ian Webber, rating the album a seven out of ten for Cross Rhythms, writes, "With this release OTO have produced a competent third recording. It may well be lost amongst more established acts but will certainly be appreciated by their fans." Giving the album four stars at Jesus Freak Hideout, Scott Fryberger says, "Onward To Olympas have another solid hardcore album in Indicator." Jonathan Anderson, awarding the album two and a half stars by The New Review, describes, "Indicator simply has not reached the bar set by its predecessors."

Track listing

Credits
Onward To Olympas
 Justin Allman - Bass
 Andrew Higginbotham - Guitar
 Kramer Lowe - Unclean Vocals
 Mark Hudson - Drums, Clean Vocals
 Kyle Phillips - Guitar, Backing Vocals

Additional Musicians
 Cas Haruna - Guest Vocals on track 1
 Ryan Leitru (For Today) - Guest Vocals on track 5
 Zach Riner (Sent By Ravens) - Guest Vocals on track 6
 Mike Perez - Guest Vocals on track 12

Production
 Taylor Larson - Producer
 Dave Quiggle - Cover Art, Layout

References

2012 albums
Facedown Records albums
Onward to Olympas albums